Panzerknacker, a German word meaning 'Armour Breaker', can refer to the following:
German name for the Disney characters Beagle Boys
The Hafthohlladung, a German anti-tank grenade used in World War II
The nickname of Heinrich von Vietinghoff (1887–1952), General (Generaloberst) of the German army during the in World War II
The popular German nickname for the soldiers awarded by Tank Destruction Badge during World War II
The Henschel Hs 129, a World War II ground attack aircraft fielded by the Luftwaffe
The name of a bonus level and character in the video game Medal of Honor: Underground
Der Panzerknacker: Anleitung für den Panzernahkämpfer. The military manual brochure published by German OKH in 1944.